XHOO-FM is a radio station on 102.3 FM in Guanajuato, Guanajuato, Mexico. XHOO is owned by Grupo Radiorama and is known as Fiesta Mexicana with a grupera format.

History
XHOO received its concession on November 28, 1988. The station signed on October 24, 1990 from a tower on Cerro Aldana and carried the name Fiesta Mexicana and a Regional Mexican/grupera format. It was the second sign-on of 1990 conducted by the Radio Cima-Crystal station group; XHML-FM, with its transmitter in León itself, had gone on air five months prior. In 1999 and 2000, it increased its power from 19 kW to 25 kW.

In 1992, XHOO moved to Cerro del Cubilete, which allowed the station a regional coverage area and allowed it to pick up a wider audience than that available to it in the state capital. Eventually, all the stations in Radio Cima-Crystal, including XHGTO-FM and XHVLO-FM, moved their studios to León, which allowed for them to be successful in the most lucrative market in the state.

On March 2, 2018, local operations of XHOO, XHSD-FM and XHGTO by Radiorama Bajío ceased due to a decision by Radiorama corporate to lease half the cluster to Multimedios Radio. The following Monday, March 5, the La Caliente grupera format replaced Fiesta Mexicana in León. The change was undone when Multimedios stopped leasing several stations from Radiorama on August 1, 2020.

References

Radio stations in Guanajuato
Radio stations established in 1988